Bayley Kuenzle (born 18 June 1998) is an Australian professional rugby union player. He currently plays for the Western Force in Super Rugby, having previously played for the Brumbies. Kuenzle's usual playing position is fly-half.

Reference list

External links
Rugby.com.au profile
itsrugby.co.uk profile

1998 births
Australian rugby union players
Living people
People educated at Newington College
Rugby union fly-halves
Rugby union centres
Canberra Vikings players
ACT Brumbies players
Western Force players
Rugby union players from Sydney